The Icelandic Opera (Íslenska óperan) is an opera company based in Reykjavík that produces operas and concerts. Its productions emphasize Icelandic artists, but regularly involve foreign artists as well. The company performs between October and May every year at the Harpa concert hall, their home venue since the hall's opening in 2011. As of October 2017, the company has produced 85 operas.

History 
The company was founded in the late 1970s by opera tenor , father of tenor Garðar Thór Cortes. He remained artistic director until Ólöf Kolbrún Harðardóttir, also an opera singer, took over in 1992. Steinunn Birna Ragnarsdóttir was appointed the new director of the company in April 2015.

The company's first performance was Leoncavallo's Pagliacci in March 1979. Since then, it has performed classics by Mozart, Rossini, Bizet, Verdi, Puccini and others.

For the first 30 years of its existence, the organization performed in the cinema  on Ingólfsstræti in downtown Reykjavík.

References

External links 
 
 The Icelandic Opera, Operabase

Opera companies
Music organizations based in Iceland